James Lassche (born 31 August 1989) is a former New Zealand rower.

At the 2010 World Rowing Championships, he won a silver medal in the lightweight men's pair partnering with Graham Oberlin-Brown. At the 2013 World Rowing Championships held at Tangeum Lake, Chungju in South Korea, he won a silver medal in the lightweight men's four with James Hunter, Curtis Rapley, and Peter Taylor.

References

1989 births
Living people
New Zealand male rowers
World Rowing Championships medalists for New Zealand
Rowers at the 2016 Summer Olympics
Olympic rowers of New Zealand